Lincent is a municipality of Wallonia located in the province of liège, Belgium. 

On January 1, 2006, Lincent had a total population of 2,998. The total area is 14.75 km² which gives a population density of 203 inhabitants per km².

The municipality consists of the following districts: Lincent, Pellaines, and Racour.

References

External links
 

Municipalities of Liège Province